Mitie Group PLC (pronounced "mighty") is a British strategic outsourcing and energy services company. It provides infrastructure consultancy, facilities management, property management, energy and healthcare services. It has a head office at The Shard in London and more than 200 smaller offices throughout the United Kingdom and Ireland.  It is listed on the London Stock Exchange and is a constituent of the FTSE 250 Index.

History
Mitie was founded by David Telling and Ian Stewart as MESL in 1987.  It was first listed on the London Stock Exchange in 1988. It merged with Highgate & Job in 1989 and was renamed the Mitie Group.

Its strategy of growth through acquisition has seen Mitie acquire several businesses over the past few years. In March 2006 it acquired Initial Security, a leading security business. In 2007 Mitie acquired Robert Prettie & Co. Ltd for £32.7m and incorporated the specialist plumbing, heating and mechanical services business into their Property Services division. In 2008 Mitie continued its strategy through the acquisition of Catering Partnership and DW Tilley.  The purchase of DW Tilley allowed Mitie to extend their roofing services nationwide. 2009 saw the acquisition of Dalkia Facilities Management for £130m to bolster its Technical Facilities Management capability, and an expansion into social housing with the purchase of Environmental Property Services (EPS) for £38.5m. In 2010, Mitie acquired the integrated facilities management business of Dalkia in Ireland.

Mitie made its first acquisition in the health and social care sector in October 2012, when it spent £111 million on homecare firm Enara. In April 2013 Mitie's chief executive, Ruby McGregor-Smith, was made non-executive director to the board of the Department for Culture, Media and Sport. In February 2014, Mitie introduced its new visual identity.

Mitie cleaners at the Royal Opera House, the Houses of Parliament, the law firm Clifford Chance, First Great Western train services, and NHS hospitals have all held demonstrations against low pay between 2013 and 2015.

In February 2014 Mitie announced an eight-year contract with the Home Office, making it the largest provider of immigration removal centres in the United Kingdom.

The firm secured a cleaning contract with Royal Cornwall Hospitals NHS Trust in June 2014 worth £90m over seven years. Sick pay cost £1.2m in its first eight months, compared with £280,000 for the NHS in the previous financial year. UNISON blamed the rise on staff stress, which it claimed had been caused by mistakes on pay. The firm admitted in November 2014 that its homecare business was less profitable than expected, and that it was struggling to recruit and retain sufficient numbers of care workers.

In March 2016 Mitie came under fire for its management of the immigration centres after the prison inspectorate said the facilities were “dirty”, “rundown” and “insanitary”.

In 2016 shares in Mitie fell to a four-year low after the company warned that an expected boom in outsourced services wasn’t happening.  In 2015 and 2016 it was reported that Mitie was one of the most shorted stocks in the FTSE 250. McGregor-Smith announced in November 2016 that it was withdrawing from the healthcare business, providing home care for the elderly, because spending cuts and rising employment costs had made it unviable.

In November 2017 the Financial Reporting Council (FRC) announced an investigation into the financial statements for the year ended 31 March 2016. This led to the disclosure in the Annual Report for 2017 that there had been errors in the impairment testing of healthcare goodwill and that, if certain judgements had instead been treated as errors, the amount of the prior year adjustment disclosed in the 2016 results would have increased by £44.0 million. This disclosure had addressed the FRC's concerns.

In December 2017, following a string of three profit warnings in the space of four months, McGregor-Smith stepped down from her role with the outsourcing group, and was replaced by former managing director of British Gas and current Chief Executive Phil Bentley.

In June 2020, Mitie announced it was to buy Interserve's 40,000-strong facilities management business in a cash and shares deal worth £271m, later revised downwards to £190m. The deal had to be ratified by Mitie's shareholders and was completed on 1 December 2020.

In January 2021, the firm ran into criticism over the management of a Covid-19 testing site it was contracted to run in Inverness, after several workers contracted the virus.

During the COVID pandemic, Mitie added a wide range of services, including running Covid-19 testing sites, cleaning offices and major transport services, and providing security for new quarantine hotels. The firm continued to work with Government departments such as the National Health Service, Department for Work and Pensions, the Ministry of Defence, and education providers.

Operations

Mitie stands for Management Incentive Through Investment Equity. Mitie's business model was originally about taking 51% equity stakes in startup businesses that fell into its broad fields of activity. The management of the new business typically invested the remaining capital, and if targets were met it was able to sell the balance of the business to Mitie after a fixed period for a sum based on the profits achieved (an earn out). Payment was made in a mixture of cash and Mitie shares. The managers usually remained with Mitie after the earnout.

Mitie is now split into: Facilities Management, Property Management, Energy Solutions and Healthcare.

Controversy
In February 2022, The Sunday Mirror revealed a Mitie WhatsApp group relating to immigration management paid by the Home Office that exchanged racist and offensive messages amongst colleagues since March 2020.

References

External links

Business services companies of the United Kingdom
Outsourcing companies
Companies listed on the London Stock Exchange
Construction and civil engineering companies of the United Kingdom
British companies established in 1987
Companies based in Bristol
Private providers of NHS services
Construction and civil engineering companies established in 1987
Business services companies established in 1987